Craniodiaphyseal dysplasia (CDD), also known as lionitis, is an extremely rare autosomal recessive bone disorder that causes calcium to build up in the skull, disfiguring the facial features and reducing life expectancy.

These calcium deposits decrease the size of cranial foramina, and can decrease the circumference of the cervical spinal canal. In the few cases recorded, most died in childhood.

Cause
The underlying genetics are uncertain.

Diagnosis
Among the medical signs are dacryocystitis, seizures, intellectual disability, and paralysis, each of which is a complication resulting from the diminutive foramina.  A common sign reported as a result of the disease has been widely spaced eyes.

In media
Peter Bogdanovich's 1985 drama film Mask drew public attention to the case of Roy Lee "Rocky" Dennis, an American boy with disorder who died at the age of 16, in 1978.

In the American medical drama Grey's Anatomy episode "Yesterday", Jesse Plemons plays a teenage boy with lionitis.

The main character of the two-issue comic book miniseries Friday the 13th: How I Spent My Summer Vacation by Wildstorm Productions is a 13-year-old boy with the disorder.  

In the anthology television series American Horror Story season 1, Beauregard, the brother of Tate and Adelaide, has lionitis.

See also
 Leontiasis ossea

References

External links 
 Craniodiaphyseal dysplasia at orpha.net

Congenital disorders of musculoskeletal system
Autosomal recessive disorders
Genetic disorders with OMIM but no gene
Rare diseases